Tony Dingwall (born 25 July 1994) is a Scottish footballer who plays as a midfielder for Brora Rangers. He has previously played for Ross County, Raith Rovers and Elgin City.

Career

Ross County
Dingwall made his first appearance for the Ross County first team on 30 August 2014, in a 4–0 defeat at Hamilton. He scored his first goal for the club on 13 December, when he scored both of the team's goals in a 2–2 draw at Motherwell. On 23 December 2014, he signed a new contract, keeping him at Ross County until summer 2017.

On 9 November 2017, Dingwall signed for Scottish League Two club Elgin City on a one-month emergency loan. Following Ross County's relegation to the Scottish Championship Tony, along with his brother Russell, signed a contract extension keeping him at County until 2019.

Raith Rovers
Dingwall signed an 18-month contract with Raith Rovers in January 2019. On 15 July 2020 it was announced that Raith Rovers had chosen not to offer Dingwall a contract for the 2020–21 season.

Elgin City
On 19 December 2020, Dingwall signed for Scottish League Two side Elgin City for the remainder of the 2020–21 season. On 2 March 2022, Dingwall left Elgin City by mutual consent.

Brora Rangers
On 4 March 2022, Dingwall signed a two-year contract with Highland League side Brora Rangers.

Personal life
Dingwall's brother Russell is also a professional footballer and currently plays for Elgin City.

Career statistics

References

External links

Living people
1994 births
Scottish footballers
Ross County F.C. players
Elgin City F.C. players
Scottish Professional Football League players
Association football midfielders
Footballers from Inverness
Raith Rovers F.C. players
Brora Rangers F.C. players